Adnan Yıldız (born 19 September 1966), is a former Turkish footballer who played as a defender.

Career
Born in Etimesgut, Yıldız played professional football for Bursaspor in the Süper Lig.

External links

1966 births
Living people
People from Etimesgut
Turkish footballers
Bursaspor footballers
Boluspor footballers
Dardanelspor footballers
Zeytinburnuspor footballers
Association football central defenders
Association football defenders